Cleopatra Selene II (Greek: Κλεοπάτρα Σελήνη; summer 40 BC –  BC; the numeration is modern) was a Ptolemaic princess, Queen of Numidia (briefly in 25 BC) and Mauretania (25 BC – 5 BC) and Queen of Cyrenaica (34 BC – 30 BC). She was an important royal woman in the early Augustan age.

Cleopatra Selene was the only daughter of Greek Ptolemaic Queen Cleopatra VII of Egypt and Roman Triumvir Mark Antony. In the Donations of Antioch and of Alexandria, she was made queen of Cyrenaica and Libya. After Antony and Cleopatra's defeat at Actium and their suicides in Egypt in 30 BC, Selene and her brothers were brought to Rome and placed in the household of Octavian's sister, Octavia the Younger, a former wife of her father.

Selene eventually married Juba II of Numidia and Mauretania. She had great influence in Mauretania's government decisions, especially regarding trade and construction projects. During their reign, the country became extremely wealthy. The couple had a son and successor, Ptolemy of Mauretania. Through their granddaughter Drusilla, the Ptolemaic line intermarried into Roman nobility for many generations.

Early life

Childhood

Cleopatra Selene was born in approximately 40 BC in Egypt, as Queen Cleopatra VII's only daughter. Her second name ("moon" in Ancient Greek) opposes the second name of her twin brother, Alexander Helios ("sun" in Ancient Greek). She was raised and highly educated in Alexandria in a manner appropriate for a princess. The twins were formally acknowledged by their father, Triumvir Mark Antony, during a political meeting with their mother in 37 BC. Their younger brother, Ptolemy Antony Philadelphos, was born a year later. Their mother most likely planned for Selene to marry her older half-brother Caesarion, son of Cleopatra by Julius Caesar, after whom he was named.

Over the next two years, Antony bestowed a great deal of land on Cleopatra and their children under his triumviral authority. In 34 BC, during the Donations of Alexandria, huge crowds assembled to witness the couple sit on golden thrones on a silver platform with Caesarion, Cleopatra Selene, Alexander Helios, and Ptolemy Philadelphus sitting on smaller ones below them. Antony declared Cleopatra to be Queen of Kings, Caesarion to be the true son of Julius Caesar and King of Egypt, and proceeded to bestow kingdoms of their own upon Selene and her brothers. She was made ruler of Cyrenaica and Libya. Neither of the children were old enough to assume control of their lands, but it was clear that their parents intended they should do so in the future. This event, along with Antony's marriage to Cleopatra and divorce of Octavia Minor, older sister of Octavian (future Roman Emperor Caesar Augustus), marked a turning point that led to the Final War of the Roman Republic.

In 31 BC. during a naval battle at Actium, Antony and Cleopatra were defeated by Octavian. By the time Octavian arrived in Egypt in the summer of 30 BC, the couple had sent the children away. Caesarion went to India, but en route he was betrayed by his tutor, intercepted by Roman forces and executed. Selene, Alexander, and Ptolemy Philadelphos went south to Thebes. Meanwhile, their parents committed suicide as Octavian and his army invaded Egypt. The deaths of their mother and Caesarion left Selene and Alexander nominally in charge of Egypt until the kingdom was officially annexed by the Roman Empire two weeks later.

Life at Rome
Octavian captured Selene and her brothers, and took them to Rome. During his triumph, he paraded the twins dressed as the moon and the sun in heavy golden chains, behind an effigy of their mother clutching an asp to her arm. The chains were so heavy that the children were unable to walk in them, eliciting unexpected sympathy from many of the Roman onlookers.

Once Egypt had ceased to exist as an independent kingdom, there remained the question of what to do with Selene and her brothers. In the absence of any surviving relative, responsibility for the children passed to Augustus, who in turn gave the siblings to Octavia to be raised in her household on the Palatine Hill. They were members of an extended family that included their half-brother Iullus Antonius (their father's son with his late wife Fulvia), their half-sisters, both called Antonia (daughters of their father with Octavia), and Octavia's older children from a previous marriage, Marcus Claudius Marcellus and his two sisters called Marcella. Between 26 and 20 BC, Cleopatra Selene is the only known surviving member of the Ptolemaic dynasty. Her brothers are not recorded in any known historical account and are presumed to have died, possibly from either illness or assassination.

Marriage and issue

Octavia arranged for Cleopatra Selene to marry the intellectual King Juba II of Numidia, whose father had committed suicide in 46 BC. He was sent to be raised in Caesar's household; on Caesar's death in 44 BC custody passed to Octavian, the future Augustus. The marriage likely took place in 25 BC and was commemorated in an epigram that survives in its entirety:

The couple had two children:
 Ptolemy of Mauretania born in 10 BC  He was named after his mother's dynasty and her younger brother. In naming her son, Cleopatra created a distinct Greek-Egyptian tone and emphasized her role as heiress of the Ptolemies in exile.
 A daughter, whose name has not survived, is mentioned in an inscription. It has been suggested that she was the Drusilla who was the first wife of Antonius Felix, but this woman was more likely a granddaughter through Ptolemy instead.

A hoard of Selene's coins has been dated at 17 AD. It is traditionally believed that she was alive to mint them, but this would mean that her husband married Princess Glaphyra of Cappadocia during Selene's lifetime. Historians generally assume that Juba wouldn't have taken a second wife as a thoroughly Romanized king, arguing that if he married Glaphyra before 4 AD, then his first wife must have already been dead. However, even contemporary client kings with Roman citizenship took multiple wives. It is possible that Selene and Juba separated for a time, but that their rift was mended after Juba's divorce from Glaphyra.

Queen of Mauretania

In 25 BC, Augustus decided to confer on Juba II and Selene the newly created client kingdom of Mauretania since Numidia was, after a brief period of status as the Roman client kingdom under king Juba II (30 - 25 BC) once again directly annexed to the Roman Empire as the part of the Roman province of Africa Proconsularis. The young rulers renamed their new capital Caesarea (modern Cherchell, Algeria), in honor of the Emperor.

Mauretania was a vast territory, but lacked organization. Cleopatra Selene is said to have exercised great influence on the policies which Juba promoted. She imported many important advisers, scholars, and artists from her mother's royal court in Alexandria to serve in Caesarea. Through the couple's influence, the Mauretanian kingdom flourished.

Economy

Cleopatra supported Mauretanian trade. The kingdom developed a significant export throughout the Mediterranean region, particularly with Spain and Italy. Their products included fish, grapes, pearls, figs, grain, wooden furniture and purple dye harvested from shellfish. Tingis (modern Tangier), a town at the Pillars of Hercules (modern Strait of Gibraltar), became a major trade centre. The value and quality of Mauretanian coins became recognised throughout the Roman Empire.

Building projects
Cleopatra's promotion of architecture marks a transition between the Hellenistic style and Roman. The construction and sculptural projects at Caesarea and Volubilis display a mixture of Ancient Egyptian, Greek and Roman architectural styles. These buildings included a lighthouse in the style of Pharos of Alexandria in the harbour, a royal palace situated in the seafront, and numerous temples dedicated to Roman and Egyptian deities. Her vigorous promotion of her mother's legacy stood in sharp contrast to the negative image being disseminated in contemporary Augustan poetry.

Death

The couple ruled Mauretania for almost two decades until Cleopatra's death at the age of 35. Controversy surrounds her exact date of death. The following epigram by Greek epigrammatist Crinagoras of Mytilene is considered to be her eulogy:

If this poem isn't simply literary license, Selene's death seems to have coincided with a lunar eclipse. If so, astronomical correlation then can be used to help pinpoint the date of her death: Lunar eclipses occurred in 9, 8, 5 and 1 BC and in AD 3, 7, 10, 11 and 14. The event in 5 BC most closely resembles the description given in the eulogy. However, the date of her death is not ascertainable with any certainty. Zahi Hawass, former Director of Egyptian Antiquities, believes Cleopatra died in 8 AD.

Selene was placed in the Royal Mausoleum of Mauretania in modern Algeria, built by her and Juba east of Caesarea and still visible. Juba died in 23 AD and was buried in the same tomb. There is a fragmentary inscription dedicated to the couple as the "King and Queen of Mauretania". Their remains have not been found at the site, perhaps due to tomb raids, possibly shortly after the mausoleum's construction; or because the structure was meant to serve as a memorial and not as a place of burial.

Legacy

Cleopatra was survived by her husband and their son Ptolemy, who ruled Mauretania together until Juba's death in AD 23. Ptolemy then reigned until 40, when he was executed by Emperor Caligula, his mother's great nephew, who was probably jealous of Mauretania's wealth. Caligula's successor, Emperor Claudius, took advantage of Ptolemy's lack of heirs and assumed control of Mauretania, turning it into the Roman provinces of Mauretania Caesariensis and Mauretania Tingitana. Thereafter, Cleopatra, Juba and Ptolemy were mostly forgotten.

One of the two satellites of the asteroid (216) Kleopatra was named Cleoselene in her honor.

In fiction
 Cleopatra Selene is mentioned in the novels by Robert Graves, I, Claudius and Claudius the God.
 Cleopatra Selene is a significant character in Wallace Breem's historical novel The Legate's Daughter (1974), Phoenix/Orion Books Ltd. 
 Cleopatra's Daughter by Andrea Ashton (1979) tells of Cleopatra Selene's early life.
The Memoirs of Cleopatra by Margaret George (1997)  mentions Cleopatra Selene's birth and early life with her mother.
 Querida Alejandría by María García Esperón (Bogotá 2007: Norma), is a novel in the form of a letter by Cleopatra Selene to the people of Alexandria.
 Cleopatra's Daughter by Michelle Moran (2009) tells the story of Cleopatra Selene's early life, from the demise of her parents through her life in Rome until her marriage to Juba II of Numidia.
 Lily of the Nile, Song of the Nile, and Daughters of the Nile, a trilogy by Stephanie Dray, tells the life story of Cleopatra Selene mixed with magical fantasy.
 Cleopatra's Moon by Vicky Alvear Shecter (2011) is a novel for teens about Cleopatra Selene. The book ends with Cleopatra's marriage to Juba II.
 Cleopatra Selene and her twin Alexander appear briefly in the television series Rome.
 Selene, córka Kleopatry by Natalia Rolleczek is a novel about Cleopatra Selene and her brothers from the death of their parents until her marriage.
 Selene is a lead character in Michael Livingston's 2015 historical fantasy novel The Shards of Heaven.
 Cleopatra Selene is a major character in "The Daughters of Pallatine Hill", by Phyllis T. Smith (2016)
 Though identified simply as the daughter of the most famous Cleopatra, a character calling herself Patra appears in the third Night Huntress book as a vampire living in modern times, and is the novel's antagonist.

See also
Caesarea
Volubilis

Notes

References

Sources

 
 
 
 Cassius Dio – Roman History
 Plutarch – Makers of Rome – Mark Antony
 Suetonius – The Lives of the Twelve Caesars – Augustus & Caligula
 Encyclopædia Britannica – Juba II

Further reading

 Draycott, Jane (22 May 2018). "Cleopatra's Daughter: While Antony and Cleopatra have been immortalised in history and in popular culture, their offspring have been all but forgotten. Their daughter, Cleopatra Selene, became an important ruler in her own right". History Today.
 Moran, Michelle. "Behind the Scenes of Cleopatra's Daughter".

External links

40 BC births
6 BC deaths
1st-century BC Egyptian people
1st-century BC Egyptian women
Kingdom of Numidia
Egyptian twins
Roman client rulers
Roman-era Egyptians
Cleopatra Selene 2
Mauretanian queens
Children of Cleopatra
Children of Mark Antony